Armelia Audrey McQueen (January 6, 1952 – October 3, 2020) was an American actress. She is best known for her roles in the Broadway musical Ain't Misbehavin' (1978–1982, 1988–1989), the film Ghost (1990), and the television series Adventures in Wonderland (1992–1994).

Background
Armelia McQueen was born January 6, 1952, in Southern Pines, North Carolina. Following the divorce of McQueen's parents, her mother married Robert Brown in New York City. In Brooklyn, McQueen attended P.S. 44 and P.S. 258. She graduated from Central Commercial High School (now Norman Thomas High School) in 1969. McQueen then attended the Fashion Industry School, majoring in fashion design. In 1972, she attended Herbert Berghof's Drama School.

McQueen died on October 3, 2020. She was 68 years old.

Stage
 Ain't Misbehavin' (1978)
 Harrigan 'N Hart (1985)
 Ain't Misbehavin' (1988)

Television shows
 Adventures in Wonderland (100 episodes)
 Martin (1992)
 Fresh Prince of Bel-Air (1993)
 Living Single (1996)
 All About the Andersons (2003)
 That's So Raven (2004)
 Related (2005)
 Hart of Dixie (26 episodes)
 Brooklyn Nine-Nine (2014) 
 Artbound (2018)  1 episode

Movies

References

External links
 
 

1952 births
2020 deaths
Actresses from New York City
Actresses from North Carolina
American television actresses
Place of death missing
American stage actresses
African-American actresses
American film actresses
People from Brooklyn
People from Southern Pines, North Carolina
20th-century African-American people
20th-century African-American women
21st-century African-American people
21st-century African-American women